Poland has a rich selection of Gold and Silver commemorative coins. In the year 2007 coins were launched in the series: "Animals of the World", "Polish Travelers and Explorers", "History of the Polish Zloty", "Monuments of Material Culture in Poland", "History of the Polish Cavalry", "Polish Painters of the Turn of 19th and 20th Centuries" and various occasional coins.

Table of contents

See also

 Numismatics
 Regular issue coinage
 Coin grading

References

Commemorative coins of Poland